Cañón del Río Lobos Natural Park is a natural park protected by the autonomous community of Castile and León, Spain. Two thirds of the park are located in the province of Soria and another third is in the province of Burgos.
It is a limestone landscape.  It includes a Special Protection Area.

References

Natural parks of Spain
Protected areas of Castile and León
Province of Soria
Province of Burgos